Ultraglide in Black is an album by the American rock music group The Dirtbombs.

The album is mostly covers of soul and funk songs. Band leader Mick Collins stated that this album was his tribute to the black music he grew up with. The only song that is not a cover is "Your Love Belongs Under a Rock."

The album cover pays homage to Stevie Wonder's 1967 album cover for I Was Made to Love Her.

Track listing

References

2001 albums
Covers albums
The Dirtbombs albums
In the Red Records albums